Hero Rupes is an escarpment on Mercury more than  long located in the southern hemisphere of Mercury. Discovered by the Mariner 10 spacecraft in 1974, it was formed by a thrust fault, thought to have occurred due to the shrinkage of the planet's core as it cooled over time.

The scarp is named after sloop Hero, Nathaniel Palmer's ship used to explore the Antarctic coast, 1820–21.

References

Scarps on Mercury